Jackson National Life Insurance Company (often referred to as simply Jackson) is a U.S. company that provides annuities for retail investors and fixed income products for institutional investors. Jackson subsidiaries and affiliates provide specialized asset management and retail brokerage services. Jackson is a subsidiary of the British insurer, Prudential plc, which acquired the company for $608 million in 1986. The company is unrelated to the American insurance conglomerate, Prudential Financial.

Founded in 1961, Jackson is headquartered in Alaiedon Township, Lansing, Michigan.

History
Jackson was named after Andrew Jackson, the seventh President of the United States. Jackson was founded in 1961 in Jackson, Michigan, and moved to its headquarters in Lansing, Michigan in 1976. In the early years, the company focused on offering term insurance to individuals as an alternative to whole life products. Jackson was an early adopter of the independent distribution model, eliminating its captive agency sales force in 1970 to sell products through independent agents. By 1984, Jackson had grown to $1 billion in assets. The company's growth attracted the attention of Prudential plc, which acquired Jackson in 1986.

In 1995, the company launched its first variable annuity and began selling guaranteed investment contracts and funding agreements through its Institutional Products Department. In 1996, Jackson introduced its first fixed index annuity (FIA).

In March 2003, Jackson entered the registered investment adviser channel with the launch of Curian Capital LLC. Jackson's acquisitions of Life Insurance Company of Georgia in 2005 and SRLC America Holding Corp. (SRLC) in 2012 each added 1.5 million in-force life insurance and annuity policies to Jackson's books.

References

External links
Official Website

Prudential plc
Companies based in Lansing, Michigan
Life insurance companies of the United States
1961 establishments in Michigan
Financial services companies established in 1961